Stephen Miller Foote (February 19, 1859 – October 30, 1919) was a United States Army officer in the late 19th and early 20th centuries. He served in the Spanish–American War and World War I, among other incidents and conflicts.

Biography
Foote was born on February 19, 1859, in La Salle Township, Michigan. He graduated from the United States Military Academy and was commissioned into the Fourth Artillery.

Foote was transferred to the Sixth Artillery, and he graduated from the Artillery School at Fort Monroe in 1888. He remained at the school as an instructor until 1891, and from 1892 to 1894, he served on the Intercontinental Railway Commission in Central America. He commanded cadets at the Vermont Military Academy from 1895 to 1897 and at the New York Military Academy from 1897 to 1898. Foote participated in the Spanish–American War, being in charge of U.S. Volunteer Engineers as well as serving as an aide during the Santiago Campaign. In the Philippines from 1899 to 1901, Foote commanded an artillery battery acting as infantry.

In April 1906, after returning to the U.S., Foote took part in a field artillery battalion march from Salt Lake City to Cheyenne, Wyoming. He commanded coastal defenses on the Atlantic, Pacific, and Gulf of Mexico coasts from 1907 to 1911. After graduating from the United States Army War College in 1913, Foote assumed command of the South Atlantic Coast Artillery District. He commanded the Coast Artillery School at Fort Monroe, the Chesapeake Bay's coastal defenses, and a reserve officers' training camp from 1916 to 1917.

Foote was promoted to the rank of brigadier general on August 5, 1917, and he took the 163rd Field Artillery Brigade to France. He commanded his brigade in battle at the Meuse-Argonne Offensive, and he continued to command it until its demobilization in February 1919. Foote also commanded a training center in France for 155mm field guns from September to December 1918. Retiring at his permanent rank of colonel, Foote died on October 30, 1919. Congress restored his brigadier general rank in June 1930.

Personal life
Foote married Sara Brooke on April 24, 1889. He was an Episcopalian.

References

Bibliography

1859 births
1919 deaths
People from Monroe County, Michigan
American military personnel of the Spanish–American War
United States Army generals of World War I
United States Army generals
United States Military Academy alumni
United States Army War College alumni
American military personnel of the Philippine–American War
Military personnel from Michigan
Burials at Arlington National Cemetery